Osmaidel Pellicier (born 30 March 1992) is a sprinter from Cuba. He competed in the 4 × 400 m relay at the 2016 Summer Olympics.

References

1992 births
Living people
Cuban male sprinters
Olympic athletes of Cuba
Athletes (track and field) at the 2016 Summer Olympics
Pan American Games medalists in athletics (track and field)
Pan American Games silver medalists for Cuba
Athletes (track and field) at the 2015 Pan American Games
Competitors at the 2014 Central American and Caribbean Games
Central American and Caribbean Games gold medalists for Cuba
Central American and Caribbean Games medalists in athletics
Medalists at the 2015 Pan American Games
21st-century Cuban people